Structure from motion may refer to:
 Structure from motion in computer vision: How to create software that recover shape information from image sequences
 Structure from motion: Psychophysics: How humans recover shape information from rotating objects